Francis the Praying Mantis is the name of a sculpture depicting a praying mantis. The sculpture is located on the East Meadow in front of the Staten Island Children's Museum, on the grounds of Sailors' Snug Harbor, in Staten Island, New York.

The original sculpture, built in 1991, was constructed from wood. It was designed and built by New York artist Robert Ressler.

In 2011, the original was demolished due to water damage and, ironically, insect infestation. Francis was redesigned, fabricated and donated by self-taught Staten Island artist Lenny Prince. Francis "2.0" is crafted from over 50 pieces of sculpted metals, including sheet metal and stainless steel, various sized muffler pipes, re-bar and other found metal objects. The realistic multi-lensed eyes are crafted from catalytic converters.

References

1991 sculptures
2011 sculptures
Animal sculptures in New York City
Buildings and structures in Staten Island
Insects in art
Sailors' Snug Harbor
Steel sculptures in New York City
Tourist attractions in Staten Island
Wooden sculptures in New York City